Hypsopygia igniflualis is a species of snout moth in the genus Hypsopygia. It was described by Francis Walker in 1859. It is found in Asia, including Borneo, Sri Lanka, China and Japan.

References

Moths described in 1859
Pyralini
Moths of Japan